Aram Vardanyan (born 11 November 1995) is an Uzbek sport wrestler of Armenian descent, who competes in the men's Greco Roman category. He claimed silver medal in the men's 72 kg event during the 2019 World Wrestling Championships after losing to Russia's Abuyazid Mantsigov.

He competed in the 77kg event at the 2022 World Wrestling Championships held in Belgrade, Serbia.

References 

1995 births
Living people
Uzbekistani people of Armenian descent
Uzbekistani male sport wrestlers
World Wrestling Championships medalists
20th-century Uzbekistani people
21st-century Uzbekistani people